Xatai may refer to:
 Ismail I (1487–1524), Shah of Iran
 Xətai (disambiguation), various villages in Azerbaijan